Hapoel Katamon Jerusalem F.C. was the name of the club that is currently called Hapoel Jerusalem, an Israeli fan-owned association football club in Jerusalem. It was conceived and founded in 2007 by Hapoel Jerusalem fans unhappy with the team's management.

At its founding, Hapoel Katamon Jerusalem became the first fan-owned football club in Israel.

In May 2020, the club's Council decided to rename the club's name to Hapoel Jerusalem, and changed the logo accordingly.

History

Football club Hapoel Jerusalem was founded in 1926. The team belonged to the "Histadrut", Israel's organization of workers unions, and represented Socialist values. In 1957, the team advanced for the first time to the top Israeli league.  Throughout the 1960s and 1970s, the years known as the "golden era" of the team, " Hapoel" outperformed and outnumbered in spectators city rivals Beitar Jerusalem – a team associated with the right-leaning "revisionist" movement. The most important achievement in the history of the club was winning the Israel State Cup in 1973.

Since the 1980s, "Hapoel" has lost its lead to Beitar Jerusalem. The team spent the 1980s and 1990s swinging between the 1st and 2nd leagues. Eventually, it was purchased by businessman Yosi Sassi in 1993, who appointed his friend, Victor Yona, as chairman. Since the late 1990s, the two got into various disputes and legal proceedings, and the team changed hands back and forth between the two.

After the 2006–07 season, in which the team  dropped for the second time to the 3rd league, and after years of searching for someone to buy Hapoel Jerusalem, disenchanted fans, extremely dissatisfied with the management, resolved to create a company with the aim of purchasing the club. When it became evident that reaching such a deal was impossible, they decided to start an alternative team. The group, led by journalist Uri Sheradski and supported by then future mayor Nir Barkat, bought Hapoel Mevasseret Zion/Abu Ghosh (which was founded in 2004 by a merger of two clubs from Abu Ghosh and Mevasseret Zion), and renamed it "Hapoel Katamon/Mevasseret Zion". The new name was taken from Katamon, a neighborhood of Jerusalem where Hapoel Jerusalem played from 1954 until moving to the YMCA Stadium and later on to the Teddy Stadium in the early 1990s. The first game was played October 19, 2007, to a crowd of 3,000; Hapoel Katamon won Hapoel Nahalat Yehuda 2–1.

Not all of Hapoel Jerusalem fans supported this move; some believed that creating Katamon was "betraying" the team. A popular slogan among the critics was "love can't be bought for a 1,000 Shekels", a reference to the membership price. However, the number of spectators at Katamon matches has steadily outnumbered that of Hapoel Jerusalem.

The club survived for 2 years in this form. The first year, the 2007–08 season, was a relative professional success, as the team reached the 7th round of the Israel State Cup, and finished the league second place, just one point shy of advancing to the Liga Artzit. In the 2008–09 season the team finished 7th place. During this second season, efforts to merge between Hapoel Katamon and Hapoel Jerusalem resumed, but to no success. Eventually, it was decided by a vote of member-fans to end the cooperation with Hapoel Mevasseret, and instead establish a new club altogether. The advantages of this move were that the new club was untied to the management of Hapoel Mevasseret, was owned and operated by Hapoel Katamon fans alone, and since it was based in Jerusalem, could be supported by the municipality. The main disadvantage was that a newly created team must start out at Liga Gimel, the 5th division.

The new club, named "Hapoel Katamon Jerusalem", started playing in late September 2009 at the Hebrew University Stadium at Givat Ram, Jerusalem. The new management form consists of 3 representatives elected by the fans. Amir Gola, a team icon, returned from retirement as a former captain of Hapoel Jerusalem to be captain of the new team. Throughout the 2008/2009 season Hapoel Katamon had a steady lead, and it finished first in the league, advancing to Liga Bet. The final home-match was played to an estimated crowd of 4,000.

For the 2009–10 season, the team reinforced with numerous new players, most notably Shai Aharon, who was Hapoel Jerusalem's captain for several years, including the 2008–09 season.
the Aharon's decision may help cement Katamon's future as "the true Hapoel Jerusalem".

Throughout the 2009–10 season in Liga Bet, Hapoel Katamon had a steady lead, and it finished first in the league, advancing to Liga Alef. At that season, the club had also established a youth branch and some of the youth teams managed to advance a league for their first season.

At the end of 2012–13 season in Liga Alef, Hapoel Katamon succeeded to qualify for Liga Leumit, where they faced Hapoel Jerusalem. Hapoel Katamon finished the 2013–14 season in Liga Leumit in the 14th place, and had to play-off against relegation with the Liga Alef play-offs winner, Ironi Tiberias. Hapoel Katamon lost 1–5 on aggregate (0–3, 1–2), and relegated back to Liga Alef. The team finished the 2014–15 season in the first place of Liga Alef's northern division, and returned to Liga Leumit.

In the 2015–16 season, the club achieved its best placing to date, when they finished fourth in Liga Leumit.

In the 2018–19 season, the club won the Toto Cup Leumit - becoming the first fan owned club to win a trophy in Israeli football. Later in the 2018-19 season the club won the Girls State Cup.

In May 2020, during the 2019–20 season, the club's Council decided to rename the club's name to Hapoel Jerusalem, and changed the logo accordingly.

Fans and social activity

Alongside professional success on the field, many fans of the team also value the ideal that a football club should represent its local community and be owned by its fans, not by businessmen. Social and ideological causes, and values such as equality and coexistence, fair play, and denouncing violence are also emphasized.

Fans of the team have taken part in various social activities, as part of what is known as "the Social Initiative". These included instructing students in various schools in Jerusalem, as well as teaching Hebrew to new immigrants. Today, the most successful of these programs is what is called the "neighborhood league", in which elementary school students represent their schools in football teams and also receive help with their schoolwork. Families of fans make up a large part of the crowd and membership owners.

Honours

League

Toto Cup

See also
Hapoel Jerusalem

References

External links
Official website 
Team Founded by Unhappy Fans May Buy the Club They Abandoned, New York Times, April 27, 2014
Hapoel Katamon: Football club brings Arabs and Israelis together, CNN, August 25, 2015

Katamon Jerusalem
Katamon Jerusalem
Hapoel Jerusalem F.C.
Association football clubs established in 2007
Association football clubs disestablished in 2020
2007 establishments in Israel
2020 disestablishments in Israel
Fan-owned football clubs